Aigues-Vives is the name of several communes in France:

 Aigues-Vives, Ariège, in the Ariège département
 Aigues-Vives, Aude, in the Aude département
 Aigues-Vives, Gard, in the Gard département
 Aigues-Vives, Hérault, in the Hérault département

Same pronunciation:
 Ayguesvives, in the Haute-Garonne département